The Liga 2 (Ligue 2) of Peru is the second-highest division in the Peruvian football league system. It is a professional and promotional division organized by the Peruvian Football Federation.  After years of changing numbers of clubs, as of 2021 the league includes 12 clubs.

History
The format of the Second Division has changed over the years. For decades after it was first formed in 1936, only clubs from the Department of Lima participated in the annual tournament. The winner was promoted to the Primera Division Peruana (First Division), the professional league.

1988-1990, the winner was promoted to the Regional Metropolitan League (Torneo Metropolitano Regional).
1991, there was no promotion because the First Division was undergoing major changes.
1992, the format changed again. This time the winner of the tournament would play against the winners of the northern, southern and central regions in order to be promoted.
1993-1997, the former system, in which the winner was directly promoted to the first division, was used.
1998, the winner of the Second Division played a game against the second-to-last placed club of the First Division, to determine which would be in the First Division.
1999-2003, the former system of promotion and relegation was used.
2004-2008, a new format was adopted, in which the winner and runner-up of the Second Division would play in the Round of 16 of the Copa Perú.
2009, the winner of the tournament was promoted to the First Division, while the last team was  relegated from the tournament and played in the 2010 edition of the Copa Perú. Their places were taken by the two relegated clubs of the First Division, and the team that finished in third place in the 2009 Copa Perú.
2010, the former system, in which the winner was directly promoted to the first division, was used. Two teams left the tournament before its start which reduced the number of teams participating back to ten.
2011, Ten teams played a home and way tournament and split the second half into two groups, the top five teams from the previous stage decided the Champion while the bottom five fought against relegation.
2012, the former system, in which the winner was directly promoted to the first division, was used. Two teams left the tournament before its start which reduced the number of teams to ten and automatically relegated them to the 2013 edition of the Copa Peru.
2013, the leagues was expanded to 16 teams. A rigorous financial stability check was implemented which only 14 teams passed. Two teams were relegated to the 2014 edition of the Copa Peru.

Competition format and sponsorship

Since 2006, the winner of the tournament is promoted to the First Division, while the last two teams are relegated from the tournament to the Departamental Stage of the Copa Perú. Their places are taken by the two relegated clubs from the First Division, and the team that finishes second place in the Copa Perú.

Sponsorship
Liga 2 is sponsored by Movistar's Gol Perú which has exclusive broadcasting rights.

Criticisms
The Segunda División has received numerous criticisms, chiefly due to the lack of stability in the process of competition and promotion, and the lack of professionalism.

Team count
The Segunda División has changed the number of teams that operate in the league several times.  Over the course of 74 years, the Segunda has had as few as four teams and as many as 16. The early Segunda División were played with an average number of teams ranging from 4 to 10. Prior to the current 12-club Segunda División, during the 2000s, the team count continued to fluctuate between 10, 12, 14, 16 and even a surprising 13. For example, 12 teams competed in 2009, 10 competed in 2008, 11 competed in 2007, and 12 teams competed from 2004-2006. The over-all goal of the organization is to have a stable league of 16 teams.

Artificial turf
Several stadiums used in the second division have artificial grass installed for the so-called massification of sport. Most stadiums in Peru are owned by the IPD (Instituto Peruano del Deporte), which is the state group responsible for supporting the use of artificial turf. This has been severely criticized by top division teams and the media. At first, these artificial turfs were installed for the 2005 FIFA U-17 World Cup; however, more artificial turf was installed in other stadiums after the U-17 World Cup concluded. These turfs are criticized for having a negative influence on the game and for the injuries which they cause to players.

Clubs
Currently, 13 clubs participate in Liga 2. There are currently no teams from the Lima Metropolitan area with all clubs representing cities from the country's interior. The number of clubs has fluctuated season by season from 10 to 16 teams participating in the tournament.

Ciclista Lima, Unión Huaral, Deportivo Municipal, Guardia Republicana, Mariscal Sucre, Unión Callao, Telmo Carbajo, Sport Boys, Unión Gonzáles Prada, and Carlos Concha trail behind with 3 titles. Universidad César Vallejo, Total Clean, Cobresol, José Gálvez, Los Caimanes, and Comerciantes Unidos are the only clubs outside the metropolitan area of Lima to have won a Segunda Division championship. In addition, Alianza Lima, Atlético Chalaco, Centro Iqueño, Defensor Lima, Municipal, Mariscal Sucre, San Agustín, Sport Boys, and Unión Huaral are the only teams that have been champions of the First and Second Division.

Since the Second Division became a nation-wide tournament in 2006, 20 of the 25 regions have had representative teams in the Segunda División/Liga 2.  The only five regions that have never had a representative are Amazonas, Huancavelica, Madre de Dios, Pasco, and Tumbes.

Stadia and Locations

Champions
Peruvian Segunda División had amateur status since its foundation until 1987. In the course of this era, Telmo Carbajo, Ciclista Lima, Unión Callao, Carlos Concha and Mariscal Sucre shared the most titles. The first run from 1943 to 1987 featured clubs only from Lima and Callao.
In 1988 the league obtained professional status and in 2006 expanded the league to the entire nation, beginning the Segunda División Nacional.

Amateur league (1943–1987)
Tournament names:
 1943–1972: "Segunda División Metropolitana"
 1983: "Segunda División Experimental"
 1984–1987: "Región IX"

Professional league (1988–present)
Tournament names:
 1988–2005: "Segunda División Metropolitana"
 2005–2018: "Segunda División Nacional"
 2019–present: "Liga 2"

Titles by club

Titles by region

Notes

See also
Peruvian football league system
Copa Perú
Ligas Departamentales del Peru
Ligas Superiores del Peru
Ligas Distritales del Peru

References

External links
FPF Official Federation Website

 
2
Peru